Pilocrocis ramentalis, the scraped pilocrocis moth, is a moth in the family Crambidae. It was described by Julius Lederer in 1863. It is found in North America, where it has been recorded from Ontario to Florida and from Wisconsin to Texas. It is also found in Mexico, Honduras, Costa Rica, Cuba and Puerto Rico. It is an introduced species on the Galápagos Islands. The habitat consists of open woods, clearings and damp areas.

The wingspan is 24–29 mm. The forewings are greyish brown with a slightly irregular, white antemedial line and a sinuous white postmedial line edged in black. The reniform spot has the form of a small white arc, edged in black basally. The hindwings are greyish brown with a single white postmedial line. Adults have been recorded on wing from February to December.

The larvae feed on Boehmeria species (including Boehmeria cylindrica), Odontonema strictum, Pachystachys spicata and Pachystachys coccinea.

References

Pilocrocis
Moths described in 1863
Moths of North America